The European Youth Orienteering Championships (EYOC) are a competition in orienteering involving competitors either between 14 and 16 or 16 and 18 (M/W 16 and M/W 18).

The current championship events are:
 Long distance
 Relay – for three-person teams
 Sprint

Host towns/cities

References

 
European youth sports competitions
Orienteering competitions